Sell Out is the first release by Boston hard rock band Halfcocked.

Track listing
"Crash" – 3:24 (Tommy O'Neil)
"Holly Wood" – (Charlee Johnson)
"Return of the Living Dead" – (Johnson)
"Superstar" – (Johnson)
"Whole in the World (Thanks for the Ride)" – (Johnson)
"Back Breaks" – (Sarah Reitkopp)
"Missing" – (Jhen Kobran)
"Less Vegas" – (O'Neil)
"Not Dead Yet" – (Johnson)
"Percocet (Kerosene)" – (Kobran)
"Heavy" – (Johnson)
"Ghost Bones" – (Johnson, O'Neil)

Personnel

Sarah Reitkopp : Singer
Tommy O'Neil : Guitar
Johnny Rock Heatley : Guitar
Jhen Kobran : Bass, backing vocals
Charlee Johnson : Drums
Jaime Richter : Guitar, backing vocals

References

Halfcocked albums
1999 debut albums